Parapheromia falsata is a species of geometrid moth in the family Geometridae. It is found in North America and Oceania.

The MONA or Hodges number for Parapheromia falsata is 6612.

References

Further reading

 

Boarmiini
Articles created by Qbugbot
Moths described in 1920